Cophixalus tetzlaffi is a species of frogs in the family Microhylidae. It is endemic to West Papua, Indonesia, where it is only known from near its type locality, Fakfak Mountains near the town of Fakfak.

Etymology
The specific name tetzlaffi honours Immo Tetzlaff, whom , the scientist who described the species, thanks for help in both New Guinea and Germany.

Description
Cophixalus tetzlaffi are small frogs, though medium-sized among Cophixalus: adult males measure  in snout–vent length. Head is broader than long, and males have a large vocal sac. Ground colour is yellowish-grey during day, getting light grey at night. There are conspicuous blackish dorsolaterar stripes, and a cream-coloured stripe running from tip of the snout to the anus.

Habitat and conservation
Males were found perched on herbaceous vegetation, shrubs, and leaf litter. The species can attain locally high densities.

As it is not known whether the species can adapt to secondary habitats, it is potentially threatened by habitat loss caused by logging and establishment of plantations.

References

tetzlaffi
Endemic fauna of Indonesia
Amphibians of Western New Guinea
Frogs of Asia
Amphibians described in 2003
Taxonomy articles created by Polbot